The Mac-Mac Falls is a 65-metre waterfall on the Mac-Mac River in the Mac-Mac Forest Nature Reserve, Mpumalanga, South Africa.

History 
Originally, the waterfall had a single stream, but miners used dynamite on the waterfall in the hopes of exposing the gold-rich reef, which now has the water falling in two streams.

It was declared a Provincial Heritage Site February 18, 1983, along with the indigenous forest in the kloof below the waterfall.

Gallery

See also 

 List of waterfalls of South Africa
 Mac-Mac

References 

Waterfalls of South Africa
Landforms of Mpumalanga